Henk de Vlieger (born 1953 in Schiedam) is a Dutch percussionist, composer and arranger.

Since 1984 he has been a permanent member of the Netherlands Radio Philharmonic Orchestra as percussionist. In May 2011 he was appointed artistic advisor to the orchestra.

Although as a creative artist de Vlieger has written a number of original compositions, he is more noted for his arrangements of works from the classic repertoire for orchestra or instrumental ensembles. These include a number of transcriptions of the works of Richard Wagner; amongst them The Ring: An Orchestral Adventure (1991), Meistersinger: an orchestral tribute (2005) and Parsifal: an orchestral quest (1993). Many of these have been recorded on the Chandos label by the Royal Scottish National Orchestra conducted by Neeme Järvi.

De Vlieger's other works include an orchestration of the Vier ernste Gesänge of Johannes Brahms (2012), and an arrangement for percussion orchestra of the Pictures from an Exhibition by Modest Mussorgsky (1981). He has also written a Handbook for the orchestral percussion section (2003). He also carried out the orchestration of the Symphony No. 1 "The Lord of the Rings" by Johan de Meij (2000).

Notes

Sources
Schott Aktuel Jan/Feb 2012 (accessed 3 March 2012)
Henk de Vlieger website (accessed 3 March 2012)

External links
 Videos  with extracts from de Vlieger's arrangement of Pictures from an Exhibition

1953 births
Living people
Dutch percussionists
Dutch male classical composers
Dutch classical composers
Dutch music arrangers
People from Schiedam
20th-century classical composers
21st-century classical composers
20th-century Dutch male musicians
21st-century male musicians